Leninskoye is a rural locality (a village) in Baltiysky Selsoviet, Iglinsky District, Bashkortostan, Russia. The population was 268 as of 2010.

Geography 
It is located 11 km from Iglino and 2 km from Baltika.

References 

Rural localities in Iglinsky District